Kai Kasiguran (born September 8, 1985 in Oakwood Village, Ohio) is an American soccer player who played for the Harrisburg City Islanders in the USL Second Division.

Career

College
Kasiguran played college soccer at Messiah College, where he was a four-year starter, He helped lead the team to three straight Division III National Championships (2004–06) and four straight Final Four appearances. He was the Division III Player of the Year in 2007, a four-time All-American, and three-time Conference Player of the Year.

Professional
Kasiguran was drafted in the first round (12th overall) of the 2008 MLS Supplemental Draft by Chicago Fire, but injuries limited his opportunities with the club.

With smaller roster sizes being applied to MLS clubs, Kasiguran was released by Chicago having never made a first team appearance, and was later signed by the Harrisburg City Islanders of the USL Second Division. He made his professional debut on April 18, 2009 in Harrisburg's 2–2 opening day tie with the Richmond Kickers.

References

External links
Q&A w/ Kai Kasiguran at PennLive.com

1985 births
Living people
American soccer players
Chicago Fire FC players
Association football midfielders
Penn FC players
USL Second Division players
Messiah Falcons men's soccer players
Chicago Fire FC draft picks
Soccer players from Ohio
People from Cuyahoga County, Ohio